Lindsay Ashford is a British crime novelist and journalist. Her style of writing has been compared to that of Vivien Armstrong, Linda Fairstein and Frances Fyfield. Many of her books follow the character of Megan Rhys, an investigative psychologist.

Life
Raised in Wolverhampton, Ashford became the first woman to graduate from Queens' College, Cambridge in its 550-year history. She gained a degree in criminology. Ashford was then employed as a reporter for the BBC before becoming a freelance journalist, writing for a number of national magazines and newspapers. In 1996, she took a crime writing course run by the Arvon Foundation. Her first book, Frozen, was published by Honno in 2003.

Strange Blood was shortlisted for the 2006 Theakston's Old Peculier Crime Novel of the Year Award. She wrote The Rubber Woman for the Quick Reads series in 2007.

Her historical mystery, The Mysterious Death of Miss Austen, was adapted for radio by Andrew Davies and Eileen Horne. It was broadcast on BBC Radio 4's Woman's Hour in February 2014.

Her novel, With Love and Crocodiles, was published independently on 4 November 2013, and was then revised and re-published in April 2015, under the title, "The Color of Secrets."

Her latest book, published in 2016, "The Woman on the Orient Express," is a novel with a fictional version Agatha Christie as its heroine.

Ashford currently lives on the Welsh coast near Aberystwyth.

Bibliography
Frozen, 2003, Honno
Also published in the United States, August, St Martin's Press
Death Studies, June 2006, Honno
The Rubber Woman, March 2007, Accent Press
Strange Blood, July 2007, Honno 
The Killer Inside, March 2008, Honno
The Mysterious Death of Miss Austen, October 2011, Honno 
With Love and Crocodiles, November 2013, CreateSpace, revised and published as "The Color of Secrets", April 2015, Lake Union Publishing
The Woman on the Orient Express, September 2016, Lake Union Publishing

Also contributed to
Written in Blood – A Honno Crime Anthology, February 2009, Honno

External links
Meet the Author: Lindsay Ashford

References

Living people
English women journalists
British crime journalists
Writers from Wolverhampton
Alumni of Queens' College, Cambridge
English women novelists
21st-century English novelists
1959 births
21st-century English women writers
Women crime writers